Lester Richard Hiatt (1931–14 February 2008), known as Les Hiatt, was a scholar of Australian Aboriginal societies who promoted Australian Aboriginal studies within both the academic world and within the wider public for almost 50 years. He is now regarded as one of Australia's foremost anthropologists.

Early life and education
Hiatt was born in Gilgandra, New South Wales, the eldest of three boys.  His father was the son of English immigrants from Gloucestershire and Devonshire. Hiatt's father was a book-keeper who rose to be manager of White Wings Flour Mill. His mother was the daughter of a Gilgandra pastry cook.

He graduated in dentistry at Sydney University in 1952, and, after passing over further studies to qualify as a doctor, -financial considerations ruled that out- he shifted his focus to anthropology. His choice had been influenced by a friendship he had formed with a Sri Lankan student of that topic, Laksiri Jayasuriya, during his undergraduate years at Wesley College. He re-enrolled in an arts course to major in anthropology, studying under A.P. Elkin and Mervyn Meggitt, though John Anderson also became an important influence. In 1955 as he opened a practice in Bourke. In 1952, he first encountered A.R. Radcliffe-Brown's work, in particular the latter's Structure and Function in Primitive Society. (1950) While in Bourke he met and married the first of his three wives, a school teacher Betty Meehan, who came from a notable unionist family with communist sympathies. They moved to Sydney and he graduated in anthropology at Sydney University in 1958. A scholarship took him to study at the Australian National University under John Barnes and Bill Stanner.

He obtained his PhD with a thesis on "Kinship and Conflict" in 1963, and rewrote the manuscript for publication in 1965 as Kinship And Conflict: A Study Of An Aboriginal Community In Northern Arnhem Land.

Primary ethnographic research
With his wife Hiatt set off in 1959 to do his primary, detailed ethnographic fieldwork for his doctorate in, and around, Maningrida, in the Northern Territory's Arnhem Land. His focus was on the Gidjingali community of the Burarra.

From the late 1950s (at which time the Australian Aboriginal community of Maningrida was first being formed and gazetted as a township),  Hiatt spent more than 45 years, off and on, researching, learning and recording the views, language, songs, stories, understandings, and practices of the Burarra-speaking Gidjingarli members.

It was here at Maningrida that Les developed some of his deepest, most persevering research relationships, producing at least one film and a book in memory of Frank Gurrmanamana, one of the 'informants' with whom he worked most closely.

In some of his late work, Hiatt attempted to analyze the ethics and value systems of Gidjingarli culture in terms of evolutionary biology and the theories of Edward Westermarck's regarding the origins of morality.

Waiting for Harry
Waiting for Harry is a film dealing with the reburial of an Anbarra man, Les Angabarraparra, at Djunawunya in Arnhem Land in July 1978, when his remains had been removed from Maningrida and returned to his traditional lands. The idea came from Frank Gurramanamana after he viewed other films on Aboriginal customary life at the AIATSIS archives in Canberra. The director was Kim McKenzie, who had been running the AIAS Film Unit.

The main mourners are Frank Gurramanamana, the deceased clan brother, and Harry Diama, Angabarraparra's maternal uncle and the senior blood-relative, without the presence of both of whom the ritual sequence cannot be completed.  The keynote theme is Harry's repeated absences: business engagements demand his attention in a nearby town; his son is up on charges and requires the father's presence in court. These continuous interruptions upset the Cape Stewart mob, who have sailed over to attend the funeral, and who were put off by Harry's endless delays. In the meantime, various aspects of the ceremony are filmed: the painting of the hollow-log coffin (yirritja), the chanting of clan songs, the gannet dance, all preliminaries before the final breaking of the bones, their arrangement in the coffin, and the interment. Hiatt, though an anthropologist, has kinship bonds with the bereaved which require him to participate actively in the proceedings he otherwise is trained to observe with an outsider's ethnographic eye.

The film won the Royal Anthropological Institute Film Award in 1982 for "the most outstanding film on social, cultural and biological anthropology or archaeology". Margaret Clunies Ross dedicated a long essay to the analysis of the film in 1989.

Institutional reforms and change
Institutional assistance and support for 'Aboriginalist' scholarship (studies into Australian Aboriginal societies) has improved from that time when Hiatt first started his own studies, and he has since been attributed with playing an important role assisting and supporting this reform (particularly during the Whitlam and Fraser governments, with the early establishment of the Australian Institute of Aboriginal and Torres Strait Islander Studies

Contributions to Australian anthropology
In addition to Dr Hiatt's detailed ethnographic records and works, there is a substantial body of written works inquiring into, questioning and sometimes challenging some of the more conventionally 'received' anthropological knowledges held by academia and the general public about Australian Aboriginal peoples. Some of these works are identified and briefly annotated below.

In one of his earliest publications, Hiatt effectively demolished the previously conventional understanding, established by the British social anthropologist Alfred Radcliffe-Brown according to which patrilineal descent is the primary social organisational principle across all Aboriginal Australians.

Works

 Oceania Monograph 51

Notes

Citations

Sources

External links
 Interviewed by Alan Macfarlane 14 July 2005 (video)

1931 births
2008 deaths
Australian anthropologists
20th-century anthropologists